Probable G-protein coupled receptor 101 is a protein that in humans is encoded by the GPR101 gene.

G protein-coupled receptors (GPCRs, or GPRs) contain 7 transmembrane domains and transduce extracellular signals through heterotrimeric G proteins.

Clinical significance 

A duplication event in GPR101 is implicated in cases of gigantism and acromegaly.

References

Further reading

G protein-coupled receptors